The Guangyun (Kuang-yun) is a Chinese rime dictionary that was compiled from 1007 to 1008 under the patronage of Emperor Zhenzong of Song. Its full name was Dà Sòng chóngxiū guǎngyùn (literally "Great Song revised and expanded rhymes"). Chen Pengnian (961–1017) and Qiu Yong were the chief editors.

The dictionary is a revision and expansion of the influential Qieyun rime dictionary of 601, and was itself later revised as the Jiyun. Pingshui Yun system, the standard for poetry rhyming after the Song Dynasty, is also based on Guangyun. Until the discovery of an almost complete early 8th century edition of the Qieyun in 1947, the Guangyun was the most accurate available account of the Qieyun phonology, and was heavily used in early work on the reconstruction of Middle Chinese. It is still used as a major source.

The Guangyun has a similar hierarchical organization to the Qieyun:
 The dictionary is split into four tones in five volumes, two for the Middle Chinese level tone and one each for the three oblique tones, rising, departing and entering.
 Each tone is split into rimes, with a total of 206 final rimes, increased from 193 in the Qieyun.
 Each rime is divided into groups of homophonous characters, with the pronunciation of each group given by a fanqie formula.
The dictionary has a total of 26,194 character entries, each containing a brief explanation of the character's meaning.

The Unihan database incorporates the "SBGY" (Songben Guangyun; "Song edition Guangyun") dataset with 25,334 head-entries for 19,583 characters.

Table of Consonants

References

Bibliography

External links

A comprehensive parallel presentation of various Qieyun fragments and editions, by Zuzuki Shingo 鈴木 慎吾, including the Kanmiu Buque Qieyun  
Songben Guangyun, with dictionary lookup – Chinese Text Project
GuangYun Initials and Rhymes, Dylan W.H. Sung
Songben Guangyun in electronic form
Yonh Tenx Myangx 韻典網 (Rhyme Dictionary Website)

Chinese dictionaries
Song dynasty literature
Middle Chinese
Traditional Chinese phonology
11th-century Chinese books